The Brumer–Stark conjecture is a conjecture in algebraic number theory giving a rough generalization of both the analytic class number formula for Dedekind zeta functions, and also of Stickelberger's theorem about the factorization of Gauss sums. It is named after Armand Brumer and Harold Stark.

It arises as a special case (abelian and first-order) of Stark's conjecture, when the place that splits completely in the extension is finite.  There are very few cases where the conjecture is known to be valid.  Its importance arises, for instance, from its connection with Hilbert's twelfth problem.

Statement of the conjecture 

From the above discussion, we can let  act on it. The Brumer–Stark conjecture says the following:

Brumer–Stark Conjecture.

The extension  is abelian.

The first part of this conjecture is due to Armand Brumer, and Harold Stark originally suggested that the second condition might hold.  The conjecture was first stated in published form by John Tate.

The term "anti-unit" refers to the condition that  is required to be 1 for each Archimedean place .

Progress 
The Brumer Stark conjecture is known to be true for extensions  where

  is cyclotomic: this follows from Stickelberger's theorem
  is abelian over 
  is a quadratic extension
  is a biquadratic extension
Samit Dasgupta and Mahesh Kakde posted an article on Annals of Mathematics about the conjecture.

Function field analogue 
The analogous statement in the function field case is known to be true, having been proved by John Tate and Pierre Deligne, with a different proof by David Hayes.

References

Conjectures
Unsolved problems in number theory
Algebraic number theory
Zeta and L-functions